The eighteen judges of the International Criminal Court (ICC) are elected for nine-year terms by the member-countries of the court. Candidates must be nationals of those countries and they must "possess the qualifications required in their respective States for appointment to the highest judicial offices".

A judge may be disqualified from "any case in which his or her impartiality might reasonably be doubted on any ground", and a judge may be removed from office if found "to have committed serious misconduct or a serious breach of his or her duties" or is unable to exercise his or her functions.

The judges are organized into three divisions: the Pre-Trial Division, Trial Division, and Appeals Division.

Qualifications, election and terms

Judges are elected to the ICC by the Assembly of States Parties, the court's governing body. They serve nine-year terms and are not generally eligible for re-election.

By the time of their election, all judges must be nationals of states parties to the Rome Statute, and no two judges may be nationals of the same state. They must be "persons of high moral character, impartiality and integrity who possess the qualifications required in their respective States for appointment to the highest judicial offices", and they must "have an excellent knowledge of and be fluent in at least one of the working languages of the Court" (English and French).

Judges are elected from two lists of candidates.  List A comprises candidates who have "established competence in criminal law and procedure, and the necessary relevant experience, whether as judge, prosecutor, advocate or in other similar capacity, in criminal proceedings". List B comprises candidates who have "established competence in relevant areas of international law such as international humanitarian law and the law of human rights, and extensive experience in a professional legal capacity which is of relevance to the judicial work of the Court". Elections are organised so that there are always at least nine serving judges from List A and at least five from List B.

The Assembly of States Parties is required to "take into account the need for the representation of the principal legal systems of the world, equitable geographical representation and a fair representation of female and male judges.  They shall take into account the need to include judges with legal expertise on specific issues, including, but not limited to, violence against women and children." Thus, there are voting requirements established which require at least six judges to be female and at least six to be male. Additionally, each regional group of the United Nations has at least two judges. If a regional group has more than sixteen states parties this leads to a minimum voting requirement of three judges from this regional group. Therefore, from the Statute's entry into force for the Maldives on 1 December 2011, all regional groups can claim a third judge.

Elections
The following elections have taken place:

 In February 2003, the Assembly of States Parties elected the first bench of eighteen judges from a total of 43 candidates. After this first election, the President of the Assembly of States Parties drew lots to assign the eighteen judges to terms of three, six or nine years; those who served for three years were eligible for re-election in 2006. The first bench of judges was sworn in at the inaugural session of the court on 11 March 2003.
 The second election was held on 26 January 2006. Five of the six outgoing judges were re-elected, but Judge Tuiloma Neroni Slade was defeated. He was succeeded by Ekaterina Trendafilova.
 The first special election took place on 3 December 2007, to replace three judges who had resigned. The three new judges were assigned to serve the remaining portions of their predecessors' terms. Pursuant to a drawing of lots, Fumiko Saiga served the remainder of Claude Jorda's term, which expired on 10 March 2009. The other two new judges' terms ended on 10 March 2012.
 The third ordinary election took place on 19–20 January 2009. Twenty-one individuals were nominated to fill the six vacancies. Only one incumbent judge, Fumiko Saiga, was eligible for re-election; she ran and was elected.
 The second special election took place on 18 November 2009 to replace two judges who had died and resigned respectively. Kuniko Ozaki of Japan and Silvia Fernández de Gurmendi were elected to serve until 2018.
 The fourth ordinary election took place during the 10th Session of the Assembly of States Parties from 12 to 21 December 2011. None of the six judges to be replaced were eligible for re-election.
 The third special election took place in November 2013 to replace a judge who had resigned.
 The fifth ordinary election took place in December 2014 to replace the judges elected in 2006.
 The fourth special election took place in June 2015 to replace a judge who had resigned.
 The sixth ordinary election took place in December 2017 to replace the judges elected in 2009.

Disqualification and removal from office
The prosecutor or any person being investigated or prosecuted may request the disqualification of a judge from "any case in which his or her impartiality might reasonably be doubted on any ground". Any request for the disqualification of a judge from a particular case is decided by an absolute majority of the other judges.

A judge may be removed from office if "found to have committed serious misconduct or a serious breach of his or her duties" or is unable to exercise his or her functions. The removal of a judge requires both a two-thirds majority of the other judges and a two-thirds majority of the states parties.

Presidency

The Presidency is the organ responsible for the proper administration of the court, except for the Office of the Prosecutor. The Presidency oversees the activities of the Registry and organises the work of the judicial divisions.  It also has some responsibilities in the area of external relations, such as negotiating agreements on behalf of the court and the promoting public awareness and understanding of the institution.

The Presidency comprises the President and the First and Second Vice-Presidents – three judges of the court who are elected to the Presidency by their fellow judges for a maximum of two three-year terms. The firsts President of the ICC were Philippe Kirsch, who served from 2003 to 2009, Sang-hyun Song from 2009 to 2015, Silvia Fernández de Gurmendi from 2015 to 2018. As of March 2018, the President is Chile Eboe-Osuji from Nigeria ; Robert Fremr of Czech Republic is First Vice-President and Marc Perrin de Brichambaut of France is Second Vice-President. All three were elected on 11 March 2018.

Judicial divisions
The eighteen judges are organized into three divisions: the Pre-Trial Division, Trial Division and Appeals Division. The Pre-Trial Division (which comprises the Second Vice President and five other judges) confirms indictments and issues international arrest warrants.  The Trial Division (the First Vice President and six other judges) presides over trials.  Decisions of the Pre-Trial and Trial Divisions may be appealed to the Appeals Division (the President and four other judges).  Judges are assigned to divisions according to their qualifications and experience.

Current structure

Judges 
As of March 2021, and after the International Criminal Court judges election in 2020, there are 18 full-time judges serving their mandate.

As of June 2018, 6 of the 18 judges are female.  The geographical representation is as follows:

Chambers 
The Judicial Chambers are organized into three main divisions. The Appeals Chamber consists of the whole Appeals Division whereas the Pre-Trial Chambers cover whole situations, authorizing as well the opening of investigation or cases. The Trial Chambers single cases (which can consist of one or more accused). Accurate as of 2020.

Former judges 

Mohamed Shahabuddeen of Guyana was elected to the court in January 2009 but he resigned for personal reasons before taking office.

Classes of judges
In 2003, the first judges were divided into three different classes of terms: those with term ending in 2006 (and re-eligible), those with term ending in 2009 and those with term ending in 2012. This list shows to which class the different judges belong.

Notes and references

 
Lists of judges